Cabela's Big Game Hunter 4 is the third sequel to the original Cabela's Big Game Hunter. It was  developed by Elsinore Multimedia Inc. and published by Activision in 2000.

Reception
AllGame gave the game a score of three stars out of four, saying that it "does a good job of simulating actual hunts and hopefully the series will evolve into full use of 3D graphics, which would drastically improve the overall presentation. Even with the basic graphics, it's still fun to play and because you have the capability to create your own land, it allows you to get more involved. Those aspects, combined with the exceptional number of animals from which you can choose and the multitude of game settings, provide for a very good hunting simulation."

References

External links

2000 video games
Windows games
Windows-only games
Activision games
Cabela's video games
Video games developed in the United States